Caulophilus is a genus of true weevils in the beetle family Curculionidae. There are more than 20 described species in Caulophilus.

Species
These 21 species belong to the genus Caulophilus:

 Caulophilus ashei Davis & Engel, 2006
 Caulophilus ayotzinapa Barrios-Izás, 2016
 Caulophilus bennetti Davis & Engel, 2007
 Caulophilus camptus Poinar & Legalov, 2015
 Caulophilus costatus Champion & G.C., 1909
 Caulophilus dirutus Kuschel, 1962
 Caulophilus dubius (Horn, 1873)
 Caulophilus elongatus Poinar & Legalov, 2015
 Caulophilus falini Davis & Engel, 2007
 Caulophilus latinasus Blatchley, W.S., Leng & C.W., 1916
 Caulophilus nigrirostris Aurivillius, 1931
 Caulophilus oryzae (Gyllenhal, 1838) (broad-nosed grain weevil)
 Caulophilus pinguis Horn & G.H., 1873
 Caulophilus rarus Legalov, 2016
 Caulophilus ruidipunctus Poinar & Legalov, 2015
 Caulophilus sculpturatus Wollaston & T.V., 1854
 Caulophilus sericatus Champion & G.C., 1909
 Caulophilus squamosus Legalov, 2016
 Caulophilus swensoni Davis & Engel, 2007
 Caulophilus veraecrucis Champion & G.C., 1909
 Caulophilus zherikhini Nazarenko, Legalov & Perkovsky, 2011

References

Further reading

 
 
 

Cossoninae
Articles created by Qbugbot